Terrorism and Political Violence is a peer-reviewed academic journal covering terrorism and counter-terrorism published by Routledge. It was established in 1989 by David C. Rapoport (University of California, Los Angeles), who remains editor-in-chief. In the editorial manifesto in its first issue, it is referred to as the Journal of Terrorism Research; however, from its first issue until the present, in editorial statements and elsewhere, it is only ever cited as Terrorism and Political Violence.

Alex P. Schmid was co-editor of the journal until 2009, and remains on the editorial board.

Abstracting and indexing 
The journal is abstracted and indexed in:

According to Thomson Reuters Journal Citation Reports, the journal has a 2018 impact factor of 1.792.

References

External links 
 

Publications established in 1989
English-language journals
Political science journals
5 times per year journals
Terrorism studies